Gelidocalamus is a genus of small to medium-sized bamboos in the grass family, native primarily to the mountains of eastern China, although one species (G. kunishii) is native to Taiwan and to the Nansei-shoto (Ryukyu Islands) region in Japan.

Species

Formerly included
see Sarocalamus 
Gelidocalamus fangianus – Sarocalamus faberi

References

Bambusoideae
Bambusoideae genera
Flora of Eastern Asia
Flora of China